Coinme is a cryptocurrency exchange headquartered in Seattle, Washington. The company offers technology for bitcoin ATMs and kiosks, which allow users to convert cryptocurrency into cash. The company launched one of the first licensed bitcoin ATMs in the U.S.

History 

According to co-founders Neil Bergquist and Michael Smyers, after learning about a Canadian bitcoin ATM, they purchased three bitcoin ATMs from a manufacturer in 2014. The two began working with the Washington State Department of Financial Institutions to revise state finance laws and secure a license to operate a kiosk.

Three pilot bitcoin ATM kiosks were situated in the greater Seattle area. One in Spitfire Grill in Belltown, another in Startup Hall at the University of Washington, and the third at Southcenter Mall south of Seattle.

Coinme was formally established in 2014 with Bergquist as CEO and Smyers as vice president of engineering. They deployed and operated nearly 70 Bitcoin ATMs across the Western United States before developing an application programming interface (API) for converting ATMs and kiosks into cryptocurrency exchanging machines.

The first state-licensed Bitcoin ATM in the United States was installed by Coinme at the Spitfire Grill in Seattle, Washington in the spring of 2014. The company later installed a bitcoin-enabled ATM in the Spokane Valley Mall and became the first licensed company in the state of Washington to offer digital currency through ATMs.

Coinme takes a 4 percent transaction fee for every dollar exchanged through its network of ATMs.

By June 2021, Coinme employed 58 people and had raised more than $30 million in investment capital. Coinme investors include Xpring, Blockchain.com Ventures, Pantera Capital, Digital Currency Group and MoneyGram International. At the end of 2021, the company was in the latter stages of completing the necessary filings to operate in all U.S. states as a money transfer license (MTL) holder.

In January 2022 the company named Tom Davis, a former IBM executive and FBI special agent, as its first general counsel. In February 2022, Brian Reisbeck joined the company as chief compliance officer.

Coinstar 

Coinstar, an operator of coin-converting kiosks, signed an agreement with Coinme in 2019 to enable consumers to purchase bitcoin at existing Coinstar machines. Coinme-enabled Coinstar machines expanded to a number of states including Connecticut, where more than 90 machines were placed in Stop & Shop and Big Y supermarkets. Coinstar and Coinme announced in October 2021 that Walmart would be putting 200 of the Coinstar-enabled bitcoin kiosks in its stores. By January of 2022, more than 7,000 Coinme-enabled Coinstar kiosks were operating in 48 U.S. states including Alaska, Pennsylvania, North Carolina, and Florida. Coinme’s partnership with Coinstar has made it the largest Bitcoin ATM network in North America.

MoneyGram 

Payments and money transfer company MoneyGram signed an agreement with Coinme in 2021 to allow customers to load cash into, or out of, bitcoin wallets. from select MoneyGram retail locations in the U.S. In 2022, MoneyGram purchased a 4% stake in Coinme.

Awards and rankings 

 Puget Sound Business Journal listed it as one of the fastest growing private companies in 2021.
 Inc. listed Coinme as one of the fastest growing companies of 2022.

References

External links 

 Coinme website

Financial technology companies
Bitcoin companies
Bitcoin organizations
Companies based in Seattle
Bitcoin exchanges